Tsawwassen Mills is a shopping mall on Tsawwassen First Nation land, in Delta, British Columbia. The mall was built by Ivanhoé Cambridge and opened on October 5, 2016. It features  of retail space and a 1,100 seat food court. It features 200 retailers, including Bass Pro Shops as well as its sister chain Uncle Bucks, and Saks Off 5th. It is modelled after the successful CrossIron Mills outside Calgary, and Vaughan Mills in Vaughan, Ontario.

Tsawwassen Mills is owned by Weihong Liu of Central Walk.

History

The mall opened on October 5, 2016, attracting 284,000 shoppers in its first six days. The grand opening attracted 50,000 and caused traffic jams in the parking lot and surrounding streets.

In May 2022, Ivanhoe Cambridge sold Tsawwassen Mills to a new owner, Central Walk.

Transportation

TransLink provides bus services along Highway 17 and 52nd Street, with connections to the Tsawwassen ferry terminal, Ladner, central Tsawwassen, and Downtown Richmond. Parking access is available from Highway 17, Salish Sea Drive, and Canoe Pass Way.

References

External links

Buildings and structures in Delta, British Columbia
Shopping malls in Metro Vancouver
Ivanhoé Cambridge
Outlet malls in Canada
Shopping malls established in 2016
2016 establishments in British Columbia